The So Good World Tour was the first major concert tour by Swedish singer Zara Larsson, in support of her international debut studio album, So Good (2017). The tour began on October 13, 2017, in Reykjavík and concluded on March 23, 2018 in São Paulo.

Background
Before the tour beginning, Larsson toured with Clean Bandit on their North American Tour 2017, across the United States and Canada. Larsson also performed at several major music festivals, including Lollapalooza, in Chicago, Summer Sonic Festival, in Japan and BBC Radio 1's Big Weekend, Parklife 2017, Capital's Summertime Ball and Wireless Festival, in England.

Daði Freyr, Wild Youth, Taya and Juliander were announced as supporting acts.

Critical response
In a review for BelfastLive, Sheena McStravick wrote: "Larsson let her talent do the talking" on a "highly energetic and incredible vocal display". McStravick also highlighted the "minimal" stage production, which included her band, two backing vocalists and four backing dancers, saying: "there were no fancy sets or objects dangling from the ceiling, it was simply lighting effects and the vocals of one immensely talented teenager". The reviewer added: "not to mention the fantastically choreographed dance routines, Larsson maintained pitch perfect vocals while simultaneously performing high energy routines".

Set list

 "Never Forget You"
 "What They Say
 "Sundown"
 "Girls Like / This Ones For You"
 "Don't Let Me Be Yours" / "Shape of You"
 "Make That Money Girl"
 "TG4M"
 "I Would Like"
 "Bodak Yellow" 
 "Ain't My Fault"
 "So Good"
 "I Can't Fall In Love Without You"
 "Only You"
 "Symphony"
 "Uncover"
 "Carry You Home" / "Rooftop" / "Single Ladies" 
 "Lush Life"

Shows

Festivals and other miscellaneous performances
This concert was part of the "Lollapalooza Festival"
This concert was part of the "Lollapalooza Festival"
This concert was part of the "Lollapalooza Festival"

Cancelled shows

Notes

References

2017 concert tours
2018 concert tours
Zara Larsson concert tours